Songs from the Road is a posthumous released live blues album by Jeff Healey. It was released in July, 2009. This album was released over a year after his death, and contains hits and covers.  As noted by one reviewer, "...the blind musician will be remembered best for playing searing guitar on his lap, looking like a pedal steel guitar man gone mad. Songs from the Road...captures Healey's gift for energizing rock and blues tunes with powerful, sometimes blistering guitar work.  It's a talent that occasionally sneaks up on the listener." Randy Bachman was invited to join the band on stage on one song, Hoochie Coochie Man.

Track listing
"I Think I Love You Too Much" (Mark Knopfler) – 5:40
"I'm Ready" (Willie Dixon) – 5:22
"Stop Breaking Down" (Robert Johnson) – 5:58
"Angel Eyes" (Fred Koller, John Hiatt) – 5:55
"Come Together" (John Lennon, Paul McCartney) – 5:23
"Hoochie Coochie Man" (Dixon) – 7:10
"White Room" (Jack Bruce, Pete Brown) – 5:36
"While My Guitar Gently Weeps" (George Harrison) – 5:14
"Whipping Post" (Gregg Allman) – 5:59
"Teach Your Children Well" (Graham Nash) – 2:49
"Santa Bring My Baby Back to Me" (Aaron Schroeder, Claude DeMetrius) – 2:10

Band members
Jeff Healey – guitar, lead vocals on 1-4, 6, 8, 10, 11
Dan Nordermeer – guitar, backing vocals
Alec Fraser – bass, lead vocals on track 7, backing vocals, producer, mixing
Dave Murphy – keyboards, lead vocals on tracks 5 and 9, backing vocals, harmonica on track 6
Al Webster – drums

Additional musicians 
Randy Bachman – guitar on track 6
 Unknown female backing vocals on track 10

References 

2009 live albums
Jeff Healey albums
Live blues albums
Live albums published posthumously